V-Rally 3 is a racing video game developed by Eden Studios and published by Infogrames Europe. It was released for the PlayStation 2 and Game Boy Advance platforms in 2002, and ported to the Xbox, GameCube, and Microsoft Windows in 2003.

Gameplay
The game focuses on the unique career mode, where the player races against bots in various rallies across an endless number of seasons, ultimately trying to become the champion. Alternatively, the game offers a quick race mode, where the player can play time attacks on the stages provided by the game or compete in one of the five different challenges it offers.

The game features 24 tracks and 20 official vehicles from the 2000 to 2002 World Rally Championship and the 2001-2002 Super 1600 Junior World Rally Championship, including the Mitsubishi Lancer Evolution VII WRC 01', the Subaru Impreza WRC 01', Toyota Corolla WRC, and (the game's "flagship" car) 2000 Peugeot 206 WRC. There are four unlockable vehicles, which can be unlocked once the player has achieved a goal (like claiming the 2.0 L Championship).

Development
V-Rally 3 was developed by Eden Studios for the PlayStation 2 console. For the game, developers built a new physics and 3D engine, which is capable of modeling vehicles in 15,000 polygons. The Game Boy Advance version was developed by VD-dev, the same team who developed the Game Boy and Game Boy Color versions of the original V-Rally game. The GBA version was originally planned to be developed at Infogrames Lyon House.

Reception

V-Rally 3 received generally favorable review from video game publications. GameSpot criticized the game's overly sensitive and poor controls, but nevertheless highlighted its "deep" career mode due to its realistic damage-modeling system and ranking system, which is based on staff morale, car reliability, season performance, and budget.

V-Rally 3 was a runner-up for GameSpots annual "Best Driving Game on Game Boy Advance" award, which went to Driver 2 Advance.

References

External links

2002 video games
Atari games
Infogrames games
Game Boy Advance games
GameCube games
Multiplayer and single-player video games
Off-road racing video games
PlayStation 2 games
Rally racing video games
Video games developed in France
Windows games
Xbox games
Eden Games games